Elio Bavutti (5 May 1914 – 9 February 1987) was an Italian cyclist. He competed in the individual and team road race events at the 1936 Summer Olympics.

References

External links
 

1914 births
1987 deaths
Italian male cyclists
Olympic cyclists of Italy
Cyclists at the 1936 Summer Olympics
Sportspeople from Modena
Cyclists from Emilia-Romagna